Pedro Macedo Camacho is a Portuguese composer of classical music as well as film and video game scores. He is known for his Requiem to Inês de Castro, his score for Star Citizen and for his contribution to World of Warcraft: Shadowlands.

Biography
Camacho was born in Funchal, a city in Madeira, and started learning composition with Argentinean composer Roberto Pérez in his home city's Conservatoire and Arts School.

After three years, Camacho moved to Lisbon, where he continued his studies in the National Conservatoire for another four years with composer and teacher Eurico Carrapatoso. Under his guidance, Camacho received an A+ classification every year, becoming the only student ever to achieve this score.

As a pianist, Camacho started with teacher and musicologist, Robert Andres, and then with the Portuguese teacher, Melina Rebelo. He got an A in the final exam in Lisbon. Camacho was one of the very few students to finish the eight years' learning program in four years' time.

Pedro continued to learn with Carrapatoso until 2006 and, after his long classical training on composition and orchestration, Pedro was taught film scoring in Berklee College of Music.

Camacho claims that composing has been an important part of his life since he was ten years old, when he started composing short musical pieces using the vintage tracker program OctaMED on an Amiga 500.

Side by side with this classical learning process, Camacho started learning jazz theory, composition and piano with the pianist Jorge Borges and, more recently, in the Portuguese Jazz School, Hot Clube Portugal.

In this concert Camacho's composition teacher, Eurico Carrapatoso, also adapted one of his works to serve as opening to the Requiem. The world premiere was a huge success and, later that year, Camacho's Requiem, dedicated to Carrapatoso, was selected as the main work for the world's first digital concert with an orchestra and choir, sponsored by Samsung.

Works

Video games

Other projects

Awards and nominations

References

External links

Pedro Macedo Camacho Studios

Pedro Macedo Camacho Personal Page

Living people
People from Funchal
Portuguese film score composers
Male film score composers
Video game composers
Tracker musicians
Year of birth missing (living people)
Berklee College of Music alumni